The New Transistor Heroes is the debut studio album by Scottish indie pop band Bis, released on 7 April 1997.

The intro to the opening song "Tell It to the Kids" was recorded by friend of the band Mark Percival, credited in the album notes as Marky P.

Track listing

Notes 
 This is the UK CD release; it matches the UK and US LP releases.
 The US LP came with a bonus 7-inch with the songs "Kkeerroolleeeenn", "Team Theme" and "Rollerblade Zero".
 The US and Australian CD releases add the songs "Team Theme", "Rollerblade Zero" and "Kkeerroolleeeenn" to the end. "Kkeerroolleeeenn" is an unlisted "hidden" track.
 The Thai CD release adds the song "Kandy Pop" to the end.
 The Japanese CD release adds the songs "Kandy Pop", "This is Fake D.I.Y" and "School Disco" to the end.
 The Japanese MiniDisc release features only the songs found on the UK CD.
 The Australian 2CD release includes all tracks from the UK CD, plus "Kkeerroolleeeenn" on disc 1, and a repackaged version of the Sweet Shop Avengerz EP as disc 2 (five tracks only).

Personnel
Bis
Manda Rin
John Disco
Sci-Fi Steven

Technical
Rik Flick – producer, engineer
Manda Rin – artwork

Charts

References 

1997 debut albums
Bis (Scottish band) albums
Wiiija albums